Swede or Swedes may refer to:

People
Swede, a resident or citizen of Sweden 
Swedes, a Germanic ethnic group
Swedes (tribe), an ancient North Germanic tribe inhabiting parts of modern-day Sweden and Finland

Individuals
Swede (nickname), a list of people
George Swede (born 1940), Canadian psychologist, poet and children's writer
Puma Swede (born 1976), Swedish porn star
Swede Hanson (wrestler) (1933–2002), ring name of American professional wrestler Robert Fort Hanson

Characters
Seymour "Swede" Levov, protagonist in the Philip Roth novel American Pastoral
"The Swede", a Norwegian on the AMC TV show Hell on Wheels

Other uses
Swede (vegetable), a root vegetable, called rutabaga in North America
Swede Lake, Minnesota, United States
Swede Mountain, New York, United States

See also
Suede (disambiguation)